A bad trip (also known as challenging experiences, acute intoxication from hallucinogens, psychedelic crisis, or emergence phenomenon) is an acute adverse psychological reaction to classic hallucinogens. With proper screening, preparation, and support in a regulated setting these are usually benign. A bad trip on psilocybin, for instance, often features intense anxiety, confusion, and agitation, or even psychotic episodes. As of 2011, exact data on the frequency of bad trips are not available.

Bad trips can be exacerbated by the inexperience or irresponsibility of the user or the lack of proper preparation and environment for the trip, and are often reflective of unresolved psychological tensions triggered during the course of the experience. In clinical research settings, precautions including the screening and preparation of participants, the training of the session monitors who will be present during the experience, and the selection of appropriate physical setting can minimize the likelihood of psychological distress. Researchers have suggested that the presence of professional "trip sitters" (i.e., session monitors) may significantly reduce the negative experiences associated with a bad trip. In most cases in which anxiety arises during a supervised psychedelic experience, reassurance from the session monitor is adequate to resolve it; however, if distress becomes intense it can be treated pharmacologically, for example with the benzodiazepine diazepam.

The psychiatrist Stanislav Grof wrote that unpleasant psychedelic experiences are not necessarily unhealthy or undesirable, arguing that they may have the potential for psychological healing and lead to breakthrough and resolution of unresolved psychic issues. Drawing on narrative theory, the authors of a 2021 study of 50 users of psychedelics found that many described bad trips as having been sources of insight or even turning points in life.

Intervention
Medical treatment consists of supportive therapy and minimization of external stimuli. In some cases, sedation is used when necessary to control self-destructive behavior, or when hyperthermia occurs. Diazepam is the most frequently used sedative for such treatment, but other benzodiazepines such as lorazepam are also effective. Such sedatives will only decrease fear and anxiety, but will not subdue hallucinations. In severe cases, antipsychotics such as haloperidol can reduce or stop hallucinations. Haloperidol is effective against acute intoxication caused by LSD and other tryptamines, amphetamines, ketamine, and phencyclidine.

Effects
Bad trips may cause hallucinogen persisting perception disorder (HPPD).

Perspectives

Stanislav Grof
Psychiatrist Stanislav Grof once said in an interview:

In a 1975 book, Grof suggested that painful and difficult experiences during a trip could be a result of the mind reliving experiences associated with birth, and that experiences of imprisonment, eschatological terror, or suffering far beyond anything imaginable in a normal state, if seen through to conclusion, often resolve into emotional, intellectual and spiritual breakthroughs. From this perspective, Grof suggests that interrupting a bad trip, while initially seen as beneficial, could potentially trap the tripper in unresolved psychological states. Grof also suggests that many cathartic experiences within psychedelic states, while not necessarily crises, may be the effects of consciousness entering a perinatal space.

Rick Strassman
Professor of psychiatry Rick Strassman is critical of reframing the experience of bad trips as one of "challenging experiences".

See also
Altered state of consciousness
Set and setting
Ego death
Existential crisis
Hard and soft drugs
Lucid dreaming
Out-of-body experience
Overdose
Posttraumatic growth
Posttraumatic stress disorder
Psychedelic experience
Psychedelic therapy
Psychedelics, dissociatives and deliriants
Psychonautics
Psychosis
Recreational drug use
Responsible drug use
Sensory deprivation
Spiritual crisis

References

External links

 Crisis Intervention in Situations Related to Unsupervised Use of Psychedelics
 Psychedelic Crisis FAQ: Helping someone through a bad trip, psychic crisis, or spiritual crisis
 Psychedelic Harm Reduction
 Psychedelic Harm Reduction and Policy lecture in the Psychedelic Science in the 21st Century conference in 2010.
 Psychedelics in the Psychiatric ER - Julie Holland, M.D. lecture in the Psychedelic Science in the 21st Century conference in 2010.
 The Psychedelic crisis (bad trip) entry at Drugs-Wiki

Drug culture
Drug overdose
Psychedelia
Substance intoxication